Pseudocoremia albafasciata, also known as the flash moth,  is a species of moth in the family Geometridae. It is endemic to New Zealand. It is classified as Nationally Endangered by the Department of Conservation.

Taxonomy 
This species was first described by Alfred Philpott in 1915 from specimens collected in Taihape in February and Feilding in March. Philpott named the species Selidosema albafasciata.  In 1917 Edward Meyrick, when listing the species, attempted to correct the spelling of the epithet to albifasciata. This spelling was itself in error. In 1988 John S. Dugdale assigned the species to the genus Pseudocoremia. He retained the original spelling of the species epithet under the ICZN Rules, Article 32a (ii) and 32c. The type specimen was collected by Augustus Hamilton and is now held at the Museum of New Zealand Te Papa Tongarewa.

Description 
Philpott described the species as follows:

Distribution  
This species is endemic to New Zealand. It has been collected in Taihape, Fielding, as well as at Puketitiri, in the Hawkes Bay.

Biology and host species 
The biology and host species of this moth is unknown.

Conservation status 
This species has been classified under the New Zealand Threat Classification system as being Nationally Endangered.

References

Boarmiini
Moths of New Zealand
Endemic fauna of New Zealand
Moths described in 1915
Endangered biota of New Zealand
Taxa named by Alfred Philpott
Endemic moths of New Zealand